Joyel Murmu is an Indian politician. He was elected to the West Bengal Legislative Assembly from Habibpur, West Bengal in the by-election in 2019 as a member of the Bharatiya Janata Party.

References

Living people
Bharatiya Janata Party politicians from West Bengal
People from English Bazar
Year of birth missing (living people)
West Bengal MLAs 2016–2021
West Bengal MLAs 2021–2026